102.7 Manaoag Dominican Radio (102.7 FM) is a radio station owned and operated by Manaoag Dominican Broadcasting Inc., the media arm of the Our Lady of Manaoag. The station's studio and transmitter are located at the Minor Basilica of Our Lady of Manaoag, Brgy. Poblacion, Manaoag.

References

Radio stations in Dagupan
Radio stations established in 2008